American country rap artist Colt Ford has released seven studio albums, one compilation album, one extended play, and one live album. Signed to Average Joes Entertainment, a label which he co-owns, Ford has charted eight times on Hot Country Songs. His most successful chart entry is "The High Life", a duet with Chase Rice that appeared on Ford's fifth studio album, Thanks for Listening.

Studio albums

Compilation albums

Extended plays

Live albums

Singles

Guest singles

Other charted songs

Video albums

Music videos

Notes

References

Discographies of American artists
Hip hop discographies
Country music discographies